Henfield was a railway station on the Steyning Line which served the village of Henfield. It was equipped with a siding which received coal to serve the Steam Mill and Gas Works.

The station closed as a result of the Beeching Axe in 1966 and now forms part of the Downs Link path. Nothing remains of the station today other than the name "Station Road". A housing estate named "Beechings" occupies much of the station's site, somewhat ironically given that it was British Rail Chairman Richard Beeching whose report recommended closure of the line.

Henfield Station was used in the Second World War as the loading point for locally grown sugar beet to be transported North to London, and Betley Bridge where the line crossed the River Adur about a mile to the North was a strategic target for German bombers.

See also 
 List of closed railway stations in Britain

References 

Disused railway stations in West Sussex
Railway stations in Great Britain opened in 1861
Railway stations in Great Britain closed in 1966
Beeching closures in England
1861 establishments in England
Former London, Brighton and South Coast Railway stations